Hajarat Yusuf (born 10 September 1982) is a retired Nigerian sprinter who specialized in the 400 metres.

She won a bronze medal in the 4 × 400 metres relay at the 2002 Commonwealth Games, and also competed individually in 2002 without reaching the final. At the 2002 African Championships she finished sixth in the 400 metres and won a silver medal in the 4 × 400 metres relay.

Her personal best time was 51.95 seconds, achieved ine June 2002 in Lagos.

References

1982 births
Living people
Nigerian female sprinters
Commonwealth Games bronze medallists for Nigeria
Commonwealth Games medallists in athletics
Athletes (track and field) at the 2002 Commonwealth Games
21st-century Nigerian women
Medallists at the 2002 Commonwealth Games